Golden Chicken 3, also known as Golden Chickensss, is a 2014 Hong Kong comedy film directed by Matt Chow and starring Sandra Ng.

Cast
 Sandra Ng as Kam, a prostitute
 Andy Lau as himself (billed as "Suddenly Starring")
 Donnie Yen as Master Yip
 Louis Koo as Jiangmen Louis Koo
 Tony Leung Ka-fai as Professor Chan
 Nick Cheung as Gordon
 Dayo Wong as Master Thirteen
 Shawn Yue as a brothel frequenter and Hikikomori
 Eason Chan as Jackie
 Ronald Cheng as Stone Age caveman / Mak Kei, the king of gigolos
 Chapman To as Tin Chung, the plastic surgeon and brothel frequenter
 Anthony Wong as the Tang Dynasty brothel frequenter
 Wyman Wong as Takuya, a Japanese gigolo
 Edison Chen as Nemoto Kishihisashii, a Japanese brothel owner
 Alex To as Joey Ma, a pimp
 Lo Hoi-pang as Mr. Au Yeung
 Chin Kar-lok as Mr. Chan, the company owner and brothel frequenter
 Hins Cheung as King Hin, a gigolo
 Cheung Siu-fai as Brother Siu Fai
 William So as Kung
 Jim Chim as Brother Chai Nga, a Chinese herbalist and Kam's old client
 Fiona Sit as La Ma, a prostitute
 Elena Kong as saleswoman
 Ivana Wong as Ng Lo, a prostitute under Kam
 Michelle Wai as Fa, a prostitute under Kam

Awards and nominations
 Annual 34th Hong Kong Film Awards
 Nomination – Best Actress (Sandra Ng Kwun-Yu)
 WON – Best Supporting Actress (Ivana Wong)
 WON – Best New Performer (Ivana Wong)
 Nomination – Best Original Film Song- "Brand New Hong Kong"- Composer/Lyrics: My Little Airport -Singer:  Nicole Au Kin-ying

Reception
The film has grossed HK$40.8 million (US$5.26 million).

References

External links
 
 Film Business Asia - Golden Chickensss set for Lunar New Year
 

2014 comedy films
2014 films
2010s Cantonese-language films
Hong Kong comedy films
Films directed by Matt Chow
Films about prostitution in Hong Kong
2010s Hong Kong films